This list is of notable people associated with Bowdoin College in Brunswick, Maine. This list includes alumni, faculty, and honorary degree recipients.

Presidents of Bowdoin

Joseph McKeen (1802–07)
Jesse Appleton (1807–19)
William Allen (1820–39)
Leonard Woods (1839–66)
Samuel Harris (1867–71)
Joshua Chamberlain (1871–83)
William DeWitt Hyde (1885–1917)
Kenneth C.M. Sills (1918–52)
James S. Coles (1952–67)
Roger Howell, Jr. (1969–78)
Willard F. Enteman (1978–80)
A. LeRoy Greason (1981–90)
Robert Hazard Edwards (1990–2001)
Barry Mills (2001–2015)
Clayton Rose (2015–present)

Distinguished graduates

Arts and letters
Note: individuals who belong in multiple sections appear in the most relevant section.

Literature and poetry
Seba Smith 1818, humorist, creator of the fictional character Major Jack Downing
Jacob Abbott 1820, academic and author of 180 books, primarily children's books
Henry Wadsworth Longfellow 1825, world-renowned poet; professor at Bowdoin (1829–31) and Harvard University (1831–54); memorialized in the Poets' Corner at Westminster Abbey; namesake, along with Hawthorne, of Bowdoin's main library
Nathaniel Hawthorne 1825, acclaimed author of classic novels The Scarlet Letter (1850) and The House of the Seven Gables (1851); namesake, along with Longfellow, of Bowdoin's main library
Charles Asbury Stephens 1869, prolific author of children's stories for The Youth's Companion
Arlo Bates 1876, novelist, poet, and professor at MIT
Robert P. T. Coffin 1915, Rhodes Scholar, winner of the Pulitzer Prize for Poetry (1936), and Bowdoin professor (1934–55)
Artine Artinian 1931, French literature scholar
John Gould 1931, novelist, humorist, and columnist
James Bassett 1934, journalist and author of the best-selling novel In Harm's Way (1962)
Lawrence Sargent Hall 1936, novelist, short-story writer, and Bowdoin professor who won the O. Henry Award (1960)
Richard Hooker 1945, doctor and author of the novel M*A*S*H (1968)
Willis Barnstone 1948, four-time Pulitzer Prize-nominated poet
Paul Batista 1970, trial lawyer, television personality, and author
Rinker Buck, 1972, author 
Robin McKinley 1975, fantasy author of the Newbery Medal-winning The Hero and the Crown (1985)
Douglas Kennedy 1976, novelist
Charlotte Agell 1981, author
Walter H. Hunt 1981, science fiction author
Taylor Mali 1987, slam poet and teaching activist
Martha McPhee 1987, novelist, nominated for the National Book Award (2002)
Meredith Hall 1993, best-selling author of Without a Map (2007)
Anthony Doerr 1995, novelist; author of All the Light We Cannot See (2014), which won the Pulitzer Prize for Fiction (2015) and was nominated for the National Book Award; writer-in-residence of the state of Idaho (2007–2010)
Claudia La Rocco 2000, poet
Jay Caspian Kang 2002, writer
Kelly Kerney 2002, author

Journalism and nonfiction writing
John Stevens Cabot Abbott 1825, biographer of Napoleon Bonaparte (1855)
John Brown Russwurm 1826, third black college graduate in the United States; founder of Freedom's Journal, America's first black newspaper (1827); governor of the Republic of Maryland (later part of Liberia) (1836–41)
Charles Beecher 1834, author, minister, and abolitionist; brother of the author Harriet Beecher Stowe, the minister Henry Ward Beecher, and educator Catharine Beecher
 New York Times Justice Department reporter Katie Benner (1999)
Edward Page Mitchell 1871, editor-in-chief of The New York Sun (1903–26)
Hodding Carter 1927, progressive journalist and winner of the Pulitzer Prize (1946)
Francis Russell 1933, historian, best known for his work on Warren Harding
Arthur Stratton 1935, author and historian
John Rich 1939, NBC News war correspondent
Marcus Merriman 1962, historian, best known for his work on Mary, Queen of Scots
Tom Cassidy 1972, CNN anchor (1981–89) and founder of the weekend news program Pinnacle
Geoffrey Canada 1974, author and activist; president and CEO of the Harlem Children's Zone
Alvin Hall 1974, financial advisor, author, and BBC television presenter
Cynthia McFadden 1978, ABC News anchor of Primetime (2004–14) and Nightline (2005–14); NBC News senior legal & investigative correspondent (2014–present)
Andrew Serwer 1981, Fortune Magazine Managing Editor (2006–present)
Scott Allen 1982, investigative reporter and lead editor of the "Spotlight" news team, The Boston Globe
Judy Fortin 1983, CNN Headline News anchor (1990–2006); medical correspondent (2006–present)
Brian Farnham 1993, editor-in-chief of Time Out New York (2006–08)
Thomas Kohnstamm 1998, author and travel writer
Alan Baker, owner and publisher of The Ellsworth American (1986–present)
Rebekah Metzler 2004, CNN, Senior White House Editor (2014–present)

Film and television
Phillips Lord 1925, radio personality, writer and actor
Albert Dekker 1927, actor
Gary Merrill 1937, actor
Burt Kwouk OBE 1953, British actor
Ned Dowd 1972, actor and film producer
John Davis 1975, film producer
Douglas Kennedy 1976, film producer
Kary Antholis 1984, Academy Award-winning filmmaker and executive at HBO Films
Marcus Giamatti 1984, actor
Brad Anderson 1986, filmmaker
Angus Wall 1988, two-time Academy Award-winning editor
Paul Adelstein 1991, actor
Hayes MacArthur 1999, actor and comedian; husband of actress Ali Larter
Hari Kondabolu 2004, stand-up comedian; featured several times on Comedy Central and on late night network television; writer/correspondent on Totally Biased with W. Kamau Bell (2012–13)
Kathleen E. McAuley   Film & TV Editor

Music
Paul "DJ Spooky" Miller 1992, trip-hop musician, turntablist and producer
Michael J. Merenda, Jr. 1998, singer-songwriter with the alternative folk band The Mammals

Art and photography
Jere Abbott 1920, art museum director who helped establish the Museum of Modern Art
Harley Schwadron 1964, cartoonist
Stephen Hannock 1974, American landscape painter
Kevin Bubriski 1975, documentary photographer
Todd Siler 1975, visual artist and researcher of creativity
Abelardo Morell 1977, photographer

Government 
Note: individuals who belong in multiple sections appear in the most relevant section.

Presidents
Franklin Pierce 1824, congressman (1833–37) and senator (1837–42) from New Hampshire; 14th President of the United States (1853–57); namesake of Franklin Pierce University in New Hampshire

U.S. Cabinet Secretaries
William Fessenden 1823, congressman (1841–43) and senator (1854–64, 1865–69) from New Hampshire; Secretary of the Treasury under President Abraham Lincoln (1864–65)
Hugh McCulloch 1827, Secretary of the Treasury under Presidents Abraham Lincoln (1865), Andrew Johnson (1865–69) and Chester A. Arthur (1884–85)
Bill Cohen 1962, congressman (1972–78) and senator (1978–97) from Maine; Secretary of Defense under President Clinton (1997–2001)

U.S. Governors
Robert P. Dunlap 1815, governor of Maine (1834–38) and congressman from Maine (1843–47)
Richard H. Vose 1822, governor of Maine (1841) and president of the Maine state senate
William G. Crosby 1823, governor of Maine (1853–55)
John Fairfield 1826, congressman (1835–38) and senator (1843–47) from Maine; governor of Maine (1839–43)
Alonzo Garcelon 1836, Civil War general, Maine governor (1879–80)
John Andrew 1837, governor of Massachusetts (1861–66) responsible for the formation of the 54th Massachusetts during the Civil War
Frederick Robie 1841, governor of Maine (1883–87)
La Fayette Grover 1846, governor of Oregon (1871–77); congressman (1859) and senator (1877–83) from Oregon
Joshua Lawrence Chamberlain 1852, Bowdoin College professor (1855–62), Civil War hero, Medal of Honor recipient (for valor on Little Round Top on the second day of the Battle of Gettysburg), Maine governor (1867–71), and president of Bowdoin College (1871–83); a statue of Chamberlain now stands at the entrance to the college
Wilmot Brookings 1855, first provisional governor of the Dakota Territory; namesake of the city and county of Brookings, both in South Dakota'
Henry B. Quinby 1869, governor of New Hampshire from 1909-1911 as well as an American Physician
William T. Cobb 1877, governor of Maine (1905–09)
John Fremont Hill 1877, governor of Maine (1901–05)
Percival Proctor Baxter 1898, governor of Maine (1921–24) and namesake of Baxter State Park
James L. McConaughy 1911 (M.A.), governor of Connecticut (1947–48) and poet
Horrace Hildreth 1925, governor of Maine (1944–48), US Ambassador to Pakistan (1953–57), and president of Bucknell University (1957–67)
James B. Longley 1947, governor of Maine (1975–79)

U.S. Senators
George Evans 1815, congressman (1829–41) and senator (1841–47) from Maine
James Bell 1822, senator from New Hampshire (1855–57)
James Ware Bradbury 1825, senator from Maine (1847–53)
Alpheus Felch 1827, Michigan governor (1846–47), senator from Michigan (1847–1853), professor of law at the University of Michigan, and namesake of Felch Township in Michigan
John Hale 1827, congressman (1843–45) and senator (1847–53) from New Hampshire; ran against Franklin Pierce 1824 as the Free Soil Party candidate for President (1852)
William Frye 1850, congressman (1871–81) and senator (1881–1911) from Maine; played a role in the founding of Bates College (1855)
Paris Gibson 1851, senator from Montana (1901–05)
William D. Washburn 1854, congressman (1879–85) and senator (1889–95) from Minnesota
Charles Fletcher Johnson 1879, senator from Maine (1911–1917)
Wallace White 1899, congressman (1916–31) and senator (1931–49) from Maine; Senate Minority Leader (1944–47); Senate Majority Leader (1947–49)
Ralph Owen Brewster 1909, Maine governor (1925–29); congressman (1935–41) and senator (1941–53) from Maine
Harold Hitz Burton 1909, senator from Ohio (1941–45); associate justice of the U.S. Supreme Court (1945–1958)
Paul Douglas 1913, professor of economics at the University of Chicago (1920–42) and senator from Illinois (1949–67)
George Mitchell 1954, senator from Maine (1982–95); Senate Majority Leader (1989–95); chairman of the Walt Disney Corporation (2004–06); winner of the Presidential Medal of Freedom (1999); Chancellor of Queen's University, Belfast

U.S. Representatives
Benjamin Randall 1809, congressman from Maine (1839–43)
Bellamy Storer 1809, congressman from Ohio (1835–37) and law professor
John Anderson 1813, congressman from Maine (1825–33) and mayor of Portland (1833–36,1842)
John D. McCrate 1819, congressman from Maine (1845–47)
John Otis 1823, congressman from Maine (1849–51)
Samuel P. Benson 1825, congressman from Maine (1853–57) and Maine Secretary of State
Jonathan Cilley 1825, congressman from Maine (1837–38) whose death in an 1838 duel with a Kentucky congressman prompted outrage and a congressional ban on the practice
Cullen Sawtelle 1825, congressman from Maine (1845–47, 1849–51)
Seargent Smith Prentiss 1826, congressman from Mississippi (1838–39)
Owen Lovejoy 1832, congressman from Maine (1857–64); abolitionist participant in the Underground Railroad
John Appleton 1834, US Minister to Bolivia (1848–49), congressman from Maine (1851–53), Assistant US Secretary of State (1857–60), and US Ambassador to Russia (1860–61)
Timothy R. Young 1835, congressman from Illinois (1849–51)
Samuel Fessenden 1834, congressman from Maine (1861–63)
Charles H. Upton 1834, congressman from Virginia (1861–62)
E. Wilder Farley 1836, congressman from Maine (1853–55)
Frederick A. Pike 1837, congressman from Maine (1861–69)
Lorenzo De Medici Sweat 1837, congressman from Maine (1863–65)
Samuel Thurston 1843, first congressman from Oregon (1849–51)
T.A.D. Fessenden 1845, congressman from Maine (1862–63)
William W. Rice 1846, congressman from Massachusetts (1877–87)
Isaac Newton Evans 1851, doctor and congressman from Pennsylvania (1877–79, 1883–87)
John A. Peters 1885, United States Representative from Maine (1913–22)
Amos L. Allen 1860, congressman from Maine (1899–1911)
Thomas Brackett Reed 1860, congressman from Maine (1877–99); Speaker of the House (1889–91, 1895–99)
De Alva S. Alexander 1870, congressman from New York (1896–1910) and United States district attorney from New York (1889–93)
Daniel J. McGillicuddy 1881, congressman from Maine (1911–17)
Frederick Stevens 1881, congressman from Minnesota (1897–1915)
John A. Peters 1885, congressman from Maine (1913–22) and United States district attorney from Maine (1922–47)
Simon M. Hamlin 1900, congressman from Maine (1935–37)
Donald F. Snow 1901, congressman from Maine (1929–33)
Robert Hale 1910, congressman from Maine (1943–59)
James C. Oliver 1917, congressman from Maine (1937–43)
Edward C. Moran, Jr. 1917, congressman from Maine (1933–37) and gubernatorial candidate (1928, 1930)
Joseph L. Fisher 1935, congressman from Virginia (1975–81)
Peter A. Garland 1945, congressman from Maine (1961–63)
Thomas H. Allen 1967, Rhodes Scholar, mayor of Portland, Maine (1991–1992), and congressman from Maine (1997–2009)
Tom Andrews 1976, congressman from Maine (1991–1995)
Pat Meehan 1978, congressman from Pennsylvania (2011–2018)

Other prominent federal governmental officials
Horatio Bridge 1825, commodore in the US Navy; chief of the Naval Bureau of Provisions & Clothing (1854–69)
Sumner Increase Kimball 1855, organizer (1878) and superintendent (1878–1916) of the U.S. Life-Saving Service, precursor to the U.S. Coast Guard
Ellis Spear 1858, Civil War general, U.S. Commissioner of Patents
Sumner Pike 1913, member of the U.S. Securities and Exchange Commission (1940–46) and member of the U.S. Atomic Energy Commission (1946–51)
E. Frederick Morrow 1930, first African American to hold an executive position at the White House
David F. Gordon 1971, Director of Policy Planning at the U.S. State Department (2007–2009).
Lawrence Lindsey 1976, professor of economics at Harvard, and director of the National Economic Council under President George W. Bush.
Khurram Dastgir Khan Minister for Defence, Pakistan (2017–Present)

Ambassadors and other diplomats
Wilhelm Haas 1953, former German Ambassador to Israel, Japan, and the Netherlands
Thomas Pickering 1953, US Ambassador to Jordan (1974–78), Nigeria (1981–83), El Salvador (1983–85), Israel (1985–88), the United Nations (1989–92), India (1992–93), and Russia (1993–96); recipient of thirteen honorary degrees
Laurence Pope 1967, US Ambassador to Chad (1993–96)
David Pearce 1972, US Ambassador to Algeria (2008–11) and Greece (2013-2016)
Christopher Hill 1974, US Ambassador to Macedonia (1996–99), Poland (2000–2004), South Korea (2004–2005), and Iraq (2009–2010); Assistant Secretary of State for East Asian and Pacific Affairs and chief US negotiator with North Korea (2005–2009)
Lawrence Butler 1975, US Ambassador to Macedonia (2002–2005)

Mayors
Samuel Merritt 1844, M.D., 13th mayor of Oakland, California (1867–69) and a founding Regent of the University of California (1868-1874)
William LeBaron Putnam 1855, mayor of Portland, Maine (1869–70) and gubernatorial candidate (1888)
Edwin M. Lee 1974, mayor of San Francisco, California (2011–2017); first Asian-American mayor in the city's history
Nick Pilch 1983, mayor of Albany, California (2020); candidate for Alameda County Supervisor (2020)
Stephen Laffey 1984, mayor of Cranston, R.I. (2002–07); candidate for U.S. Senate (2006)
Thomas Wilson 1985, mayor of Tuxedo Park, New York (2011–2013); candidate for U.S. Congress (2012)
Patrick J. McManus 1976, mayor of Lynn, MA (1992-2001)

City and state officials
Stirling Fessenden 1896, Chairman (1923-1929) and Secretary-General (1929-1939) of the Shanghai Municipal Council
Terry Hayes 1980, member of the Maine House of Representatives and Maine State Treasurer
Hoddy Hildreth 1949, Member of the Maine House of Representatives and conservationist
Peter Steinbrueck 1979, Seattle city councilman and activist
Nick Pilch 1983, Albany, CA City Council Member, Vice Mayor, and Mayor (2014-2020) and advocate
Deborah Foote 1983, New Hampshire House of Representatives (1992–98)

Activists
DeRay Mckesson 2007, civil rights activist

Law
Note: individuals who belong in multiple sections appear in the most relevant section.

U.S. Supreme Court Justices
Melville Weston Fuller 1853, 8th Chief Justice of the United States (1888–1910)
Harold Hitz Burton 1909, senator from Ohio (1941–45); associate justice of the U.S. Supreme Court (1945–1958)

Federal and state judges
Josiah Pierce 1821, Judge of Probate for Cumberland County, Maine
Thomas Drummond 1830, Judge of the United States Court of Appeals for the Seventh Circuit
Amos Morrill 1834, Judge of the United States District Court for the Eastern District of Texas
William LeBaron Putnam 1855, Judge of the United States Court of Appeals for the First Circuit
Clarence Hale 1869, Judge of the United States District Court for the District of Maine
Frank George Farrington 1872, Associate Justice Maine Supreme Judicial Court (1928–1933)
Charles Fletcher Johnson 1879, Judge of the United States Court of Appeals for the First Circuit
John A. Peters 1885, Judge of the United States District Court for the District of Maine
John David Clifford, Jr. 1910, United States district judge for the District of Maine (1933–47)
Ronald Rene Lagueux 1953, United States district judge for the District of Rhode Island (1986–present)
George J. Mitchell 1954, Judge of the United States District Court for the District of Maine
Michael Anello 1965, Judge of the United States District Court for the Southern District of California
Berle M. Schiller 1965, United States district judge for the Eastern District of Pennsylvania (2000–present)
John A. Woodcock, Jr. 1972, United States district judge for the District of Maine (2003–present)

Federal attorneys
Amory Holbrook 1841, first United States attorney for the Oregon territory and senatorial candidate
Pat Meehan 1978, United States attorney for the Eastern District of Pennsylvania (2001–08)

Legal academics and other legal figures
Hoyt Augustus Moore 1895, Cravath, Swaine, and Moore presiding partner
Edward G. Hudon 1937, librarian for the U.S. Supreme Court (1972–76)
Fred Fisher 1942, Boston attorney and figure in the Army-McCarthy hearings
Dennis J. Hutchinson 1969, Rhodes Scholar, law clerk to US Supreme Court Justice William O. Douglas, professor of law at the University of Chicago, and biographer of Justice Byron White (1998)
Christopher Wolf 1976, law professor and attorney that represented Joseph Wilson and Valerie Plame and was in critical in the formation of internet law
Cara H. Drinan, professor of law at The Catholic University of America's Columbus School of Law
Karen Mill-Francis, retired Miami-Dade County judge and television arbitrator Judge Karen

Military
John F. Appleton 1860, Union Army colonel during the Civil War
Joshua Lawrence Chamberlain 1852, Bowdoin College professor (1855–62), Civil War brigadier general, Medal of Honor recipient, Maine governor (1867–71), and president of Bowdoin College (1871–83)
Michael J. Connor 1980, USN Vice Admiral, Commander, Submarine Forces (2012–2015)
Abraham Eustis 1806 (M.A.), officer during the War of 1812
Francis Fessenden 1858, Union Army brigadier general during the Civil War
James Deering Fessenden 1852, Union Army brigadier general during the Civil War
Andrew Haldane 1941, USMC Silver Star recipient during World War II
Charles Henry Howard 1859, Union Army officer and newspaper publisher
Oliver Otis Howard 1850, Civil War major general, commissioner of the Freedmen's Bureau (1865–72), and founder and president of Howard University (1869–74)
Thomas Hamlin Hubbard 1857, Civil War colonel, lawyer, financier, philanthropist
Thomas Hyde 1861, Medal of Honor recipient during the Civil War and founder of Bath Iron Works (1884)
Everett P. Pope 1941, USMC Medal of Honor recipient during World War II
Ellis Spear 1858, Civil War colonel, U.S. Commissioner of Patents
Henry Clay Wood 1854, U.S. Army brigadier general who received the Medal of Honor for heroism at the Battle of Wilson's Creek

Science and medicine
William Smyth 1822, professor of mathematics and philosophy at Bowdoin; author of popular textbooks on algebra, trigonometry, geometry and calculus (1833–59)
John H. C. Coffin, 1834 and 1837, astronomer and educator at United States Naval Academy
James Liddell Phillips 1860, D.D.(Hon.) 1878, medical missionary to India. Christian Missionary founder of the Bible School at Midnapore.
Augustus Stinchfield 1868, co-founder of the Mayo Clinic
George Edwin Lord 1869, doctor killed at the Battle of Little Big Horn in 1876
Francis Robbins Upton 1875, mathematician and inventor; long-time associate of Thomas Edison; first student ever to receive a graduate degree from Princeton (1877)
Edwin Hall 1875, physicist, discoverer of the Hall effect, used worldwide in sensors and has led more recently to the quantum Hall effect, the international standard defining the ohm in electrical resistance
Robert Peary 1877, Naval officer and leader of the first expedition to reach the North Pole (1909)
Donald MacMillan 1898, member of the Peary expedition and pioneering Arctic explorer
Philip Hunter Timberlake 1908, prolific entomologist and writer of scientific essays
Malford W. Thewlis 1911, pioneer of gerontology and founder of the American Geriatrics Society
Alfred Kinsey 1916, sex researcher, author of the controversial Kinsey Reports (1948, 1953), professor at Indiana University (1920–56), and founder of the Institute for Sex Research (1947)
Myron Avery 1920, environmentalist instrumental in the creation of the Appalachian Trail
Cornelius P. Rhoads 1920, pathologist and oncologist; winner of awards for his contributions to the field of oncology; the American Association for Cancer research named an award after him, which was later renamed following a scandal
John Ripley Forbes 1938, conservationist and philanthropist of nature museums
J. Ward Kennedy 1955, cardiologist who made novel studies concerning the heart's pumping power
Auden Schendler 1992, corporate environmentalist prominently featured in issues of Time Magazine and Businessweek
Herbert Lovett, American psychologist

Athletics
Whitey Witt, starting center fielder for the World Series-winning 1923 New York Yankees team
Fred Tootell 1923, Olympic gold medalist in the hammer throw (1924)
George Mitchell 1954, Senate Majority Leader (1989–95); in 2007 released the Mitchell Report concerning steroid abuses in Major League Baseball
Fred Ahern 1974, NHL hockey player
Dale Arnold 1979, two-time Emmy Award-winning sportcaster
Joan Benoit Samuelson 1979, world record holder and winner of the Boston (1979, 1983), Olympic (1984) and Chicago (1985) marathons
Rick Boyages 1985, head coach for William & Mary Tribe men's basketball (2000–2003)
Joe Beninati 1987, television play-by-play announcer for the Washington Capitals (1994–present) and Major League Lacrosse (2001–present)
Tom Ryan 1993, professional lacrosse player and coach
Jared Porter 2003, general manager of the New York Mets (2020–2021)
Sean Starke 2003, professional ice hockey player
Will Hanley 2012, professional basketball player in the Liga ACB in Spain
Ben Brewster 2014, professional soccer player (2013-2017) and NCAA D1 collegiate coach (2017-present)

Business
Henry Varnum Poor 1835, founder of Standard & Poor's
Jonathan Eveleth 1847, founder of first U.S. oil company
Thomas Hyde 1861, Medal of Honor recipient and founder of Bath Iron Works (1884)
Charles W. Morse 1877, American ice, shipping and banking magnate; ruined the career of New York mayor Robert Van Wyck and helped spark the Panic of 1907
 Freelan Oscar Stanley 1877, co-inventor of the Stanley Steamer, and builder of the Stanley Hotel
L. Brooks Leavitt 1899, investment banker, partner, Paine, Webber & Co., Overseer, Bowdoin College, donor to college library
Harvey Dow Gibson 1902, Red Cross commissioner and president of the Manufacturers Trust Co; served on the board of the 1939 New York World's Fair
Everett P. Pope 1941, Medal of Honor recipient, bank president, and longtime member (1977–87) and chairman of the college's Board of Trustees (1985–87)
Charles Ireland, Jr. 1942, president of CBS (1971–72)
Bernard Osher 1948, billionaire auctioneer of Butterfield & Butterfield and philanthropist
Raymond S. Troubh 1950, independent financial consultant, general partner at Lazard (1961–74), and interim chairman at Enron (2002–2004)
Peter Buck 1952, billionaire co-founder of the Subway sandwich chain (1965) and physicist
George Mitchell 1954, chairman of the Walt Disney Corporation (2004–06)
Leon Gorman 1956, president (1967–2001) and chairman (2001–present) of L. L. Bean
 Donald M. Zuckert 1956, chairman and CEO of Ted Bates Worldwide, Inc.
David A. Olsen 1959, CEO of Johnson & Higgins (1990–97); vice chairman of Marsh & McLennan (1997) and then board member (1997–present)
Kenneth Chenault 1973, president (1997–2001) and CEO (2001–present) of American Express; the first African-American CEO of a Fortune 500 company
Sheldon M. Stone 1974, Oaktree Capital Management founder and partner
Stanley Druckenmiller 1975, billionaire financier and philanthropist; former business associate of George Soros
Robert F. White 1977, founding member of Bain Capital
John Studzinski 1978, American-British investment banker and philanthropist and CBE
James "Jes" Staley 1979, former head of investment banking at JPMorgan Chase
Reed Hastings 1983, founder (1997) and CEO (1997–present) of Netflix

Charity and nonprofit
Geoffrey Canada 1974, author and activist; president and CEO of the Harlem Children's Zone
John J. Studzinski 1978, investment banker and champion of the homeless and the arts; founder of the Genesis Foundation
Josiah Spaulding Jr. 1974, president and CEO of the Citi Performing Arts Center (Wang Theatre) in Boston, MA

Academia
Note: individuals who belong in multiple sections appear in the most relevant section.

College founders and Presidents
Nathan Lord 1809, president of Dartmouth College (1828–63)
Alpheus Packard, Sr. 1819, professor (1824–65) and acting president (1882–84) of Bowdoin College
William C. Larrabee 1828, president of DePauw University (1848–1849)
William Henry Allen 1833, president of Dickinson College (1847–48) and Pennsylvania State University (1864–68)
Samuel Harris 1833, president of Bowdoin College (1867–71) and Dwight Professor of Systematic Theology at Yale Divinity School (1871–95)
Cyrus Hamlin 1834, co-founder of Robert College in Istanbul (1860); president of Middlebury College (1880–85)
Alonzo Garcelon 1836, donor of Bates College (1855), Civil War general, Maine governor (1879–80)
 Laurie G. Lachance 1983, president, Thomas College (2012– )
George Frederick Magoun 1841, first president of Iowa College, now Grinnell College (1865–1885)
Oliver Otis Howard 1850, Civil War general, commissioner of the Freedmen's Bureau (1865–72), and founder and president of Howard University (1869–74)
Kenneth Sills 1901, president of Bowdoin College (1918–52)
Asa S. Knowles 1930, president of the University of Toledo and Northeastern University, and namesake of the building which houses the Northeastern School of Law
Lawrence Lee Pelletier 1936, president of Allegheny College, and namesake of the school's library
Robert W. Morse 1943, first president of Case Western Reserve University (1966–71)
George Mitchell 1954, Chancellor of Queen's University, Belfast
Roger Howell, Jr. 1958, Rhodes Scholar, Professor of History, and president of Bowdoin College (1969–78)
Barry Mills 1972, president of Bowdoin College (2001–2015)
Meredith Jung-En Woo 1980, professor at Northwestern University (1989–2000) and the University of Michigan (2001–present); Dean of the College and Graduate School of Arts and Sciences at the University of Virginia (2008–2015); president of Sweet Briar College (2017–present); expert on Korean politics
Paul A. Chadbourne professor 1858, President of University of Wisconsin, Williams College, and University of Massachusetts
 Adam S. Weinberg 1987, president of Denison University (2013–present)
 Herman Dreer, president of Douglass University in St. Louis, educational reformer and activist

Professors and scholars
Calvin Ellis Stowe 1824, professor of religion at the Andover Theological Seminary, Dartmouth College and Bowdoin College; husband and literary agent of Harriet Beecher Stowe
Henry Boynton Smith 1834, theologian and professor at Amherst College (1847–50) and the Union Theological Seminary (1850–74)
Ezra Abbot 1840, influential biblical scholar and professor at the Harvard Divinity School (1872–84)
Charles Carroll Everett 1850, theologian and philosopher; professor at (1869–78), and dean of (1878–1900), the Harvard Divinity School
William Alfred Packard 1851, classical scholar and professor at Princeton University
Jonathan Stanton 1856, ornithologist and professor at Bates College (1863–1906)
Oliver Patterson Watts 1889, professor of chemistry at University of Wisconsin
Boyd Bartlett 1917, military officer and physics professor at the United States Military Academy
Robert Albion 1918, author and professor at Princeton University (1922–47) and at Harvard University (1948–65)
Douglas Chalmers 1953, Chair of Columbia University's Political Science Department (1978-1986); Acting Dean of Columbia University's School of International and Public Affairs (1996-1997); Director of Columbia University's Institute for Latin American and Iberian Studies ( ? - present)
Richard E. Morgan 1959, distinguished professor of Government at Bowdoin College (1969–2014)
Peter Hayes 1968, Holocaust historian
Bruce E. Cain 1970, Rhodes Scholar and Charles Louis Ducommun Professor at Stanford University (2012–present)
Ralph G. Steinhardt 1976, Arthur Selwyn Miller Research Professor of Law at the George Washington University Law School (1985–present)
Lyman Page 1978, astronomer, physicist, and professor at Princeton University
Thomas Glave 1993, O. Henry Award-winning short story writer, essayist and English professor at Binghamton University

Religion
 Rev. Joshua Young, Unitarian minister who presided over the funeral of John Brown.

Fictional Alumni
Hawkeye Pierce, the protagonist of Richard Hooker's novel, M*A*S*H (1968), attended a school based on Bowdoin; played by Donald Sutherland in the Academy Award-winning film version (1970) and by Alan Alda in the long-running TV series (1972–83)
Dr. Wilbur Larch, the pro-choice doctor who raises Homer Wells, the protagonist of John Irving's novel, The Cider House Rules (1985); Michael Caine won an Academy Award when he portrayed him in the 1999 film version
Homer Wells, the protagonist of John Irving's The Cider House Rules (1985), recipient of a Bowdoin degree forged by his mentor and father figure, Dr. Wilbur Larch; played by Tobey Maguire in the 1999 film version
Forney Hull, the main love interest of the lead character in Billie Letts' novel, Where the Heart Is (1995); played by James Frain in the 2000 film version
Derek Shepherd ("McDreamy"), a lead character played by Patrick Dempsey in the popular TV series Grey's Anatomy (2005–2015)
Gilbert, a character in Paul Harding's Pulitzer Prize-winning novel Tinkers (2009), a semi-legendary literary figured who graduated from Bowdoin and is rumored to have been one of Nathaniel Hawthorne's classmates
Horace Guilder, the villain in Justin Cronin's 2012 novel The Twelve, mentions having running cross-country at Bowdoin.

Honorary degree recipients

John Neal M.A. 1836, American poet, novelist, journalist, critic, editor, lecturer, athlete, and activist
Jefferson Davis L.L.D. 1859, senator from Mississippi (1847–53, 1857–61), Secretary of War under President Franklin Pierce (1853–1857), and president of the Confederate States of America (1861–65)
Joshua Young, D.D., 1890, abolitionist, minister of several congregations in Vermont and Massachusetts
Ashley Day Leavitt D.D. 1918, Pastor, State Street Congregational Church, Portland, Maine
Robert Frost Litt.D. 1926, Pulitzer Prize-winning poet and professor at Amherst College (1916–38)
Leverett Saltonstall L.L.D. 1940, Governor and United States Senator from Massachusetts
Sturgis Elleno Leavitt Litt.D. 1943, scholar of Spanish language and literature, University of North Carolina at Chapel Hill
Harlan Fiske Stone L.L.D. 1944, Attorney General under President Calvin Coolidge (1924–25); Associate (1925–41) and Chief (1941–46) Justice of the Supreme Court
N.C. Wyeth A.M. 1945, American artist and illustrator
Margaret Chase Smith L.L.D. 1952, representative (1940–49) and senator (1949–73) from Maine
Sir Roger Makins LL.D. 1955, British Ambassador to the United States
Edmund Muskie L.L.D. 1957, Maine governor (1954–58); senator from Maine (1958–1980); Secretary of State under President Jimmy Carter (1980–81)
David Rockefeller L.L.D. 1958, banker and philanthropist
Roswell Gilpatric L.L.D. 1963, attorney, United States Deputy Secretary of Defense
Edward Brooke LL.D. 1969, senator from Massachusetts (1967–79)
Andrew Wyeth D.F.A. 1970, American artist
E. Frederic Morrow L.L.D. 1970, first black US presidential aide; former Bowdoin undergraduate (1926–30)
Olympia Snowe L.L.D. 1983, representative (1979–94) and senator (1994–present) from Maine
Berenice Abbott D.F.A. 1982, photographer
George H. W. Bush L.L.D. 1982, 43rd Vice President (1981–89) and 41st President of the United States (1989–1993)
Maya Angelou, Litt.D. 1987, Pulitzer Prize-winning poet and author
Ken Burns L.H.D. 1991, director of documentaries on the American Civil War (1990), baseball (1994) and jazz (2001)
Cornel West L.H.D. 1999, celebrity professor at Yale, Harvard and Princeton
Paul Simon L.L.D. 2001, congressman (1975–85) and senator (1985–97) from Illinois
Grace Paley Litt. D. 2003, essayist and short story writer
Shulamit Ran Mus.D. 2004, Pulitzer Prize-winning composer
Torsten N. Wiesel S.D. 2004, Nobel Prize winner in medicine
Frederick Wiseman D.F.A. 2005, documentary filmmaker
Roger Angell L.H.D. 2006, senior editor of The New Yorker
Drew Gilpin Faust L.H.D. 2007, president of Harvard University
Yvon Chouinard L.H.D. 2008, businessman, climber, founder of Patagonia Inc.
Gina Kolata Litt.D. 2008, science journalist for The New York Times
Kenneth Roth L.L.D. 2009, executive director of Human Rights Watch
Edward Albee L.H.D. 2009, Pulitzer Prize-winning playwright
John E. Baldacci L.L.D. 2011, governor of Maine (2003-11)
Mira Nair D.F.A 2011, Academy Award-nominated Indian filmmaker
Madeleine Albright L.L.D 2013, first female United States Secretary of State
Patrick Dempsey L.H.D. 2013, actor and philanthropist
Susan Rice L.L.D. 2018, U.S. Ambassador to the United Nations (2009–13), U.S. National Security Advisor (2013–17), and U.S. Domestic Policy Council Director (2021–present)

Notable faculty members and trustees (non-graduates)
John Chandler (1762–1841), congressman and senator from Maine, trustee
William King (1768–1862), Maine governor, trustee
Jesse Appleton (1772–1819), president of Bowdoin and father of first lady Jane Pierce
Parker Cleaveland (1780–1858), professor (50 years plus), scientist, "Father of American Mineralogy"
Andrews Norton (1786–1853), theologian, visiting faculty member
Amos Nourse (1794–1877), senator from Maine, professor of obstetrics
James Bradbury (1802–1901), senator from Maine, trustee
Roswell Dwight Hitchcock (1817–1887), professor of natural and revealed religion
Charles Abiathar White (1826–1910), professor of natural history
George Trumbull Ladd (1842–1921), professor of philosophy
Alex Marzano-Lesnevich, professor of English
Roy Ridley (1890–1969), writer and poet, visiting faculty member
Adam Walsh (1901–1985), NFL Coach of the Year for the Cleveland Rams
Rex Warner (1905–1986), English classicist, visiting faculty member
Louis Coxe (1918–1993), poet and author, longtime professor of English
Thomas Cornell (1937-2012), professor of art
Elliott Schwartz (1936–2016), composer and Robert K. Beckwith Professor of Music Emeritus
Brian Lukacher, art historian
Angus King (1944–present), Maine governor, US Senator, adjunct faculty member
Richard Ford (1944–present), Pulitzer Prize-winning novelist of Independence Day (1995)
Paul Franco (1956–present), professor of political philosophy
Michael Crow (1956–present), president of Arizona State University, trustee
Anthony Walton (1960–present), poet and writer-in-residence
Scott Sehon (1963–present), professor of philosophy
John Bisbee (1965–present), sculptor and professor of art
Kristen R. Ghodsee, ethnographer, professor of gender and women's studies
Eddie Glaude, professor of religion
Charles Beitz, professor of politics, former Dean of Academic Affairs
Richard E. Morgan, professor of politics, conservative writer
Susan Faludi, Pulitzer Prize-winning feminist scholar, professor of gender and women's studies
 Bob Griffin (born 1980), American-Israeli basketball player, and English Literature professor
Matthew Stuart (-present), professor of philosophy

See also 
 List of Bates College people
 List of Colby College people
 List of Dartmouth College people

References

Bowdoin College people
Bowdoin College